Adoxophyes telesticta is a species of moth of the family Tortricidae. It is found on Mauritius and Madagascar.

The larvae feed on Citrus aurantifolia and Eugenia parkeri.

References

Moths described in 1930
Adoxophyes
Moths of Africa